Puerto Rico Highway 153 (PR-153) is a rural road that goes from Santa Isabel, Puerto Rico to Coamo. This road extends from PR-1 in downtown Santa Isabel and ends at its junction with PR-14 and PR-138 near downtown Coamo.

Major intersections

See also

 List of highways numbered 153

References

External links
 

153